Dave Coutts may refer to:

 Dave Coutts (musician), member of Ten Inch Men
 Dave Coutts (footballer) (1905–1956), Australian rules footballer